Oleg Shargorodsky (born 18 November 1969) is a Russian ice hockey player. He competed in the men's tournament at the 1994 Winter Olympics.

Career statistics

Regular season and playoffs

International

References

1969 births
Living people
Soviet ice hockey players
Olympic ice hockey players of Russia
Ice hockey players at the 1994 Winter Olympics
Sportspeople from Kharkiv
Phoenix Roadrunners (IHL) players
Houston Aeros (1994–2013) players
Fort Wayne Komets players